The Change is the 13th book in the Animorphs series, written by K.A. Applegate. It is narrated by Tobias.

Plot summary

Tobias takes Rachel on a tour, to show her the Yeerk pool entrance that he had discovered. Soon, though, he finds he is not where he was heading; they suddenly are flying over the forest, without warning. He turns and turns but cannot get to the spot he wants to go to. They try to fly away but discover that they are still in the same spot. A pair of Hork-Bajir come up from a secret hatch in the woods. The two aliens are promptly pursued by human-Controllers on dirtbikes and jeeps, bristling with shotguns and automatic rifles. Tobias and Rachel decide to help the supposed fugitives. They lead the male to safety, but the female is struck by a vehicle. The first Hork-Bajir screams for his wife, yelling in his language, but the Animorphs do not understand. He tells them then that she is his wife. The Animorphs tell him to run or he might die, and the Hork-Bajir runs for his life. Tobias then leads him to a cave for the time being, leaving the female Hork-Bajir behind.

The other Animorphs suspect a Yeerk trap to lure them, but they return to the cave the Hork-Bajir is hiding in. He calls himself Jara Hamee. But Ax isn't convinced he's not a Controller, so Jara pulls his head open. Horrified, but seeing no Yeerk, the Animorphs have some peace of mind. But just then Controllers had found out where they were. The team concocts a plan. To help Jara Hamee escape, Rachel morphs him (Jara Hamee turns around in order not to see Rachel demorphing). Tobias is worried about Rachel, so he hitches a ride on one of her forehead blades. However, Tobias slaps into a branch, is knocked off, and finds himself in a Swainson's hawk's clearing, where the other Hork-Bajir is cornered by a group of human-Controllers and Visser Three himself. The Visser calls this Hork-Bajir Ket Halpak. Tobias provides a distraction by drawing out an aggressive Swainson's hawk, the "owner" of this clearing, and rakes the Visser's stalk eyes, allowing Ket Halpak to escape.

With Jara Hamee and Ket Halpak reunited, the Animorphs now need to decide where to hide them. Tobias suggests a hidden valley with fresh streams, a meadow, and tall trees. But he'd never seen the place in his life, even though the images are clear in his mind. Tobias now suspects foul play - and that someone or something is manipulating him.

During the night while he is guarding the Hork-Bajir along with Ax, Tobias suddenly has visions of tracker Taxxons hunting. He doesn't know exactly but he has a feeling that they are tracking him. To avoid the Taxxons picking up the Hork-Bajir scent, Tobias and Ax take the Hork-Bajir and retreat further toward the mountains. While riding on the Hork-Bajir, Jara Hamee tells Tobias that a voice in his head just told him to escape with his wife from the Yeerk Pool and that "it" would send a guide. Frustrated about being used, Tobias stops everyone and demands to find out what is happening. He yells in his head and asks who is manipulating him, threatening not to go on unless this voice gives him some answers.

Tobias then finds himself in another plane, and sees himself as both human and hawk. He then encounters the Ellimist, who explains that while his species does not interfere with other people's lives, he wishes to save the Hork-Bajir, and the Ellimist justifies himself by saying that the Animorphs owe him their lives. Tobias also learns that when he could not get anywhere earlier and the images in his head were all the Ellimist's doing. Frustrated, Tobias wants to be made human in return for his efforts. The Ellimist says that he knows what Tobias wants but asks Tobias if he himself really knows what he wants.

Tobias and the Animorphs take the Hork-Bajir to the mountains, pursued by Yeerks in Dracon beam-wielding helicopters, Hork-Bajir, and Taxxons. Tobias, out hunting breakfast (while the other Animorphs, Ax, and the Hork-Bajir are still trying to climb the mountain), is caught in the helicopter's rotor vacuum, and breaks his wing against a tree. He is immediately discovered by a raccoon, who prepares to eat him. At that moment, the Ellimist asks Tobias if he wants the reward for his services now and makes him able to morph again, but does not return him his human form. Tobias is enraged, accusing the Ellimist of not keeping his promise. Tobias escapes by morphing the raccoon. Once more, he rejoins the others in his hawk form already healed.

The Animorphs realize that the Yeerks will not give up until the Hork-Bajir are dead because if two escaped safely, others would try. Tobias comes up with a plan. Ax, Cassie, and the Hork-Bajir go to the safe clearing while the others execute the plan. Tobias morphs Ket Halpak and, together with Rachel in Jara Hamee morph, go over to the ravine. Rachel is made to jump over the ravine, where she is caught by Marco, in gorilla morph, in a small cave right below the top of the ravine that is not visible from the top. However, Tobias is intercepted by Visser Three. He yells "Ket Halpak free!", convincing Visser Three that he is the Hork-Bajir, and runs toward the ravine, Visser Three being forced to allow him to fall as otherwise, even if he killed Tobias, the Hork-Bajir's momentum would carry Visser Three over the edge of the cliff as well. At the bottom, the real Ket Halpak and Jara Hamee are pretending to be dead, while Cassie and Jake are in wolf morph pretending to eat them. Visser Three is convinced that they are dead and the Yeerks give up searching. They take the Hork-Bajir to the valley which is mysteriously difficult to locate from a distance without prior knowledge of its existence. Ket and Jara tell the Animorphs that they are expecting a baby.

Tobias has his morphing power back. He thinks about what the Ellimist had said and laments that maybe he didn't want to be a human again. Tobias falls asleep, and wakes up in his old bedroom—the Ellimist apparently had sent him back in time to the night before he first met Elfangor. The "past" Tobias (human) wakes up, and the "present" Tobias (hawk) acquires his DNA before the past version falls back asleep. He also tells him to go to the construction site with Jake. As a result, he can morph his own human body for up to two hours at a time (or, as later books will point out, stay in human form forever—the Ellimist, in this way, was giving him a choice.) The next day (Monday), he shows up at school for Rachel's Packard Foundation Outstanding Student award ceremony, as a human, to Rachel's amazement.

Morphs

TV series
An episode, "Face-Off: Part 1", was loosely based on this book. In the novel, Tobias regains his morphing powers and a human morph thanks to the Ellimist. In the episode, he regains his powers due to the disk that Elfangor gave the Animorphs in the first episode.

References

Animorphs books
1997 science fiction novels
1997 American novels
Books about birds